Sovereign, published in 2006, is a historical mystery novel by British author C. J. Sansom. It is Sansom's fourth novel and the third in the Matthew Shardlake Series. Set in the 16th century during the reign of King Henry VIII, it follows hunchbacked lawyer Matthew Shardlake and his assistant, Jack Barak as they investigate a series of murders and a plot to question the legitimacy of the line of succession to the English throne.

Plot
Set in the autumn of 1541, the novel describes fictional events surrounding Henry VIII's 'Progress' to the North (a state visit accompanied by the royal court and its attendants, the purpose of which was to accept the formal surrender from those who had rebelled during the Pilgrimage of Grace). Most of the novel is set in York though events in London and on the return journey via Hull are also depicted.

Matthew Shardlake (a London lawyer) and his assistant Jack Barak arrive in York ahead of the Progress to fulfill an official role but also with a secret mission from Thomas Cranmer, Archbishop of Canterbury. The official role is to deal with petitions to the king from the citizens of York; the secret mission is to ensure the welfare of an important political prisoner, Sir Edward Broderick, so that he can be brought to London for questioning in the Tower of London. However, events are quickly complicated when the murder of a York glazier leads Shardlake to the discovery of important documents that bring the king's right to the throne into question.

Characters
Historical characters portrayed in the novel include:

 Henry VIII (King of England)
 Catherine Howard (Queen of England; the King's fifth wife)
 Jane, Lady Rochford (the Queen's lady-in-waiting)
 Thomas Cranmer (Archbishop of Canterbury)
 Sir Richard Rich (statesman)
 Thomas Culpeper (courtier)
 Francis Dereham (courtier)
 The late Robert Aske (executed leader of the failed Pilgrimage of Grace)
 The late Cecily Neville (wife of Richard of York and ancestor of the King)
 The late Edward Blaybourne (in the novel, author of a mysterious confession)

Fictional characters include:

 Matthew Shardlake
 Jack Barak (Shardlake's assistant)
 Sir Edward Broderick (a political prisoner)
 Sir William Maleverer (chair of the Council of the North)
 Fulke Radwinter (Broderick's gaoler in York Castle)
 Simon Craike (a lawyer, once Shardlake's fellow student)
 Giles Wrenne (also a lawyer, now advanced in years)
 Jennet Marlin (one of Lady Rochford's attendants)
 Tamasin Reedbourne (a servant of the queen's household)

2006 British novels
Crime novels
Novels by C. J. Sansom
Novels set in the 1540s
Novels set in York
Macmillan Publishers books